Brouzet-lès-Alès (literally Brouzet near Alès) is a commune in the Gard department in southern France.

Geography

Climate

Brouzet-lès-Alès has a humid subtropical climate (Köppen climate classification Cfa).

Population

See also
Communes of the Gard department

References

Communes of Gard